Peckham Rye is an open space and road in the London Borough of Southwark in London, England. The roughly triangular open space lies to the south of Peckham town centre. It is managed by Southwark Council and consists of two contiguous areas, with Peckham Rye Common to the north and Peckham Rye Park to the south. The road Peckham Rye forms the western and eastern perimeter of the open space.

Peckham Rye is also a ward of the London Borough of Southwark, forming part of the Camberwell and Peckham constituency.

Location
Peckham Rye railway station on Rye Lane is a short distance north of the open space in Peckham. To the east is Nunhead, to the south is Honor Oak and to the west is East Dulwich. Barry Road connects the Rye with Dulwich Library while Friern Road is named after an old friary.

History

It was on the Rye in the 1760s that the artist William Blake claimed to have seen visions. According to Blake's biographer Alexander Gilchrist, his first vision was one of "a tree filled with angels, bright angelic wings bespangling every bough like stars."

The Park includes the 49 acres of land south of the Common that surrounded Homestall Farm, which was purchased by the Vestry and London County Council in 1868, for £51,000. A few other small parcels of land were later incorporated into the Park when the leases of Homestall Farm and other properties expired.

The land for Peckham Rye Park was purchased by the London County Council for £51,000 and declared open on 14 May 1894. Homestall Farm was 13 acres. One of the first features of the new park, an ornamental 'Old English Garden' was created. It was later renamed the 'Sexby Garden' after Lt-Col JJ Sexby the London County Council's first Chief Officer of Parks. It was re-developed in 1936 and the paths re-laid with yorkstone paving.

During World War II, part of the Common became a Prisoner of War camp for Italian prisoners of war.

The River Peck was largely enclosed in 1823. Today, parts of this stream can still be seen on the west side of Peckham Rye Park.

The Park includes a Japanese garden and hosts a weekly Parkrun event.

Local landmarks

Cultural references
Peckham Rye is also Cockney rhyming slang for tie (necktie).

Muriel Spark's 1960 novel The Ballad of Peckham Rye tells the story of a Scotsman moving to the area.

2019 movie Blue Story makes many references to Peckham, and in particular Peckham Rye when talking about the location of rival gangs and gang warfare in the area.

2020 song Comet Face from King Krule references Peckham Rye.

References

External links

Know Your Ryes, local landmarks with "Rye" and "Peckham Rye" in their names

Parks and open spaces in the London Borough of Southwark
Common land in London